Lynn Marie Nelson (born January 8, 1962) is an American long-distance runner. She competed in the women's 10,000 metres at the 1988 Summer Olympics.

References

External links
 

1962 births
Living people
Athletes (track and field) at the 1988 Summer Olympics
American female long-distance runners
Olympic track and field athletes of the United States
Place of birth missing (living people)
21st-century American women